Box of Toys were a short-lived British new wave band, consisting of members Brian Atherton (lead vocals and keyboards), Andy Redhead (drums and guitar), Phil Martin (sax, keyboards and vocals), and Roy Campbell (bass and vocals). They released two singles, "I'm Thinking of You Now" in 1983, and "Precious Is the Pearl" in 1984.

History
Box of Toys were formed around the breakup of A Select Committee (active from 1981–83), a powerpop band consisting of members Brian Jones, Tim Lees, Steve Downey, Phil Martin and Andy Redhead. Two members from that band, Redhead and Martin, then teamed up with Roy Campbell and Brian Atherton to form Box of Toys. Before releasing any material, the quartet recorded a session with John Peel in April 1983. The band then released two singles, "I'm Thinking of You Now" (b/w "Old Man Rome") in August 1983, and "Precious Is the Pearl" (b/w "It Goes Without Saying" and "When Daylight Is Over") in 1984. The band ultimately split in late 1984, and its members went their separate ways. Andy Redhead formed the band 3D, with Johnny 'Riff' Reynolds and Brian Rawlins. Brian Atherton went on to form The Light.

Discography

Singles
 1983: "I'm Thinking of You Now" b/w "Old Man Rome"
 1984: "Precious Is the Pearl" b/w "It Goes Without Saying"
 1984: "Precious Is the Pearl" b/w "It Goes Without Saying"/"When Daylight Is Over"

References

External links

English new wave musical groups
Musical groups established in 1982
Musical groups disestablished in 1984
British synth-pop new wave groups
1982 establishments in the United Kingdom